Wang Ying (born 8 October 1981) is a Chinese retired ice hockey player. She was a member of the Chinese women's national ice hockey team and represented China in the women's ice hockey tournament at the 2002 Winter Olympics and at the 2003 Asian Winter Games, where China won bronze.

References

External links
 
 
 
 
 

1981 births
Living people
Chinese women's ice hockey defencemen
Sportspeople from Heilongjiang
Olympic ice hockey players of China
Ice hockey players at the 2002 Winter Olympics
Asian Games bronze medalists for China
Medalists at the 2003 Asian Winter Games
Ice hockey players at the 2003 Asian Winter Games
Asian Games medalists in ice hockey
21st-century Chinese women